The State Register of Heritage Places is maintained by the Heritage Council of Western Australia. , 143 places are heritage-listed in the Shire of Mundaring, of which 26 are on the State Register of Heritage Places.

List
The Western Australian State Register of Heritage Places, lists the following 26 state registered places within the Shire of Mundaring:

References

Mundering